CHHI-FM is a Canadian radio station broadcasting at 95.9 FM in Miramichi, New Brunswick with a classic hits format branded on-air as Rewind 95.9 owned by Stingray Group. The station began broadcasting on May 6, 2013.

History and broadcasting
The station received approval from the CRTC to operate on the FM frequency at 95.9 FM on May 18, 2012, and began broadcasting on May 6, 2013, at 9:59 am with the station's first song "Raise Your Glass" by Pink.

The station was originally proposed to have been carrying a country format, but switched to hot AC prior to the station's launch, following the change of formats at competing station CFAN-FM from adult contemporary to country.

Since the launch, the station has changed its format to adult hits in response to listener demand. On February 12, 2021, the station flipped to classic hits branded as Rewind 95.9.

References

Former logo

External links
Rewind 95.9

Hhi
Hhi
Hhi
Mass media in Miramichi, New Brunswick
Radio stations established in 2013
2013 establishments in New Brunswick